Calculated Risk is a 1963 British crime thriller film directed by Norman Harrison.

Plot
Bank robber Kip is released from Wormwood Scrubs Prison on a snowy morning. He goes to visit the grave of his wife who died while he was in prison. Back home he starts to plan a bank robbery based on idea a co-prisoner had told in prison before dying. This involves breaking into a basement bank vault via the cellar of a bombed house and interconnecting old air-raid shelter.

A gang of men is recruited to execute the robbery by Steve, Kip's young brother-in-law, who drove him home upon his release, and who, because of his planning expertise, has assumed the leadership. They plan to rob a bank by tunnelling through a basement of a bomb-site next door. Steve has planned crimes before, but never participated; but he's compelled to take Kip's place, after Kip collapses because of his weak heart.

The crooks enter the basement of an empty building next to the Westland Bank through a trap door, and break through the wall dividing the properties, but are shocked when they find an unexploded 500lb bomb from the war.

Repelled by the sight of a squeeking rat, Steve throws something at it to frighten it away. They plant explosives into the rear wall of the bank vault. Just after breaking in, Steve hears the bomb ticking, but tells no one. The object, thrown at the rat, inadvertently also knocked the shell's casing. As they escape, a concrete lintel falls on Steve; (Kip, impatient and alone at home, with no one to control him, had earlier gone against the plan, and went to see how they were progressing). The other two run away upon hearing the ticking bomb; one to forewarn his girlfriend living in a nearby house, who calls the police. Though Kip is always scorned by the other gang members for being a jinx, as he's almost always been caught before, nonetheless, he's the only one who tries to rescue Steve.

Desperate to end his life of poverty, Kip alone stays, and retrieves the sacks of money; but his efforts to lift the beam bring on a fatal heart attack. Just as the internally-injured Steve reaches the trap door, he stumbles on the loose bricks, and falls back down, exhausted. The old bomb explodes. The council workmen, who were due in a few weeks to begin clearing the site in preparation for the building of a neighbourhood swimming pool, shall now be able to do so safely.

Cast
 William Lucas as Steve
 John Rutland as Kip
 Dilys Watling as Julie
 Shay Gorman as Dodo
 Terence Cooper as Nodge
 David Brierly as Ron
 Warren Mitchell as Simmie
 Vincent Charles as Mr Salting
 Harry Landis as Charlie
 John G. Heller as Police Inspector
 Peter Welch as Police Sergeant
 Brian Cobby as Police Constable

Critical reception
TV Guide concluded "British crime melodrama has little going for it"; Radio Times praised Warren Mitchell's cameo, but called the film a "tatty little drama"; whereas Mystery File wrote "The script is tight, the vivid black-and-white photography perfect for the tale that’s told, and even though none of the actors are sic [is] known in this country – and maybe not even in England – they all fit their characters well, and what more could you want?"

References

External links

1963 films
British crime thriller films
British heist films
British black-and-white films
1960s crime thriller films
1960s heist films
1960s English-language films
1960s British films